Twenty Lake is a lake in Aitkin County, Minnesota, in the United States.

Twenty Lake was named from its location, in section 20.

See also
List of lakes in Minnesota

References

Lakes of Minnesota
Lakes of Aitkin County, Minnesota